Created by The Glenn Gould Foundation, The Glenn Gould Prize is an international arts award. Originally awarded every three years, and now biennially, the Prize is presented to a living individual of any nationality, in recognition of a body of work that has enriched the human condition through the arts, taking into account such factors as transcendent artistry, innovation, influence on a given artistic discipline or the culture at large, and humanitarian achievements.

An international jury of distinguished artists, arts professionals, and arts patrons selects the prize Laureate. 

Originally Laureates received a cash award of C$50,000, a sum raised to C$100,000 in 2013. Each Laureate is charged with selecting the recipient of The Glenn Gould Protégé Prize. Protégés receive C$15,000, and both winners and protégés receive a small bronze sculpture of Glenn Gould made by Canadian sculptor Ruth Abernethy. 

In the year following each Laureate’s selection, the Foundation organizes a series of celebratory activities that highlight the unique contributions of the winner, both to the arts and society. These have included concerts, art exhibitions, street performances, symposia, multimedia celebrations, book publication, educational activities, film screenings, theatrical performances, broadcasts and master classes. Prize celebrations have lasted as long as two weeks and have included as many as 25 individual events to audiences up to 24,000, generating tens of millions of media impressions

A portrait of each laureate is also displayed in Toronto at the Glenn Gould Studio of the Canadian Broadcasting Corporation.

The Prize jury changes for each award, and typically consists of renowned artists, arts professionals and patrons representing various disciplines from around the world. The prize is funded by The Glenn Gould Prize Fund, which was established through the courtesy of Floyd S. Chalmers, with contributions by numerous administrations and foundations, including the Government of Canada. The main provider was the Canada Council, and since 2000 it has been the foundation itself.

The Glenn Gould Prize is presented to the laureates and protégés in a series of celebratory events that reflect the artistic, social, humanitarian and educational impact of the particular laureate, and embody the goals of the Prize: "Celebration, Inspiration, Transformation."

The Twelfth laureate of the Glenn Gould Prize is soprano, activist and humanitarian Jessye Norman. Jury celebrations took place at Koerner Hall, in Toronto, Ontario, Canada in April, 2018.
The winner of The Glenn Gould Protégé Prize is American jazz vocalist Cécile McLorin Salvant. 

The Twelfth Glenn Gould Prize presentation was made on February 20, 2019 at the Four Seasons Centre, featuring the Orchestra of the Canadian Opera Company, a host of international guest artists and conductors, and Prize Jury Chair Viggo Mortensen. The Prize concert was the culmination of 12 days of educational, cultural and socially significant events honoring Ms. Norman during Black History Month.

Awards

 Laureates
 1987 R. Murray Schafer, Canada
 1990 Yehudi Menuhin, US/Swiss/Britain
 1993 Oscar Peterson, Canada
 1996 Toru Takemitsu, Japan
 1999 Yo-Yo Ma, France/United States
 2002 Pierre Boulez, France
 2005 André Previn, Germany/United States
 2008 José Antonio Abreu, Venezuela
 2011 Leonard Cohen, Canada
 2013 Robert Lepage, Canada
 2015 Philip Glass, United States
 2018 Jessye Norman, United States
 2020 Alanis Obomsawin, Canada
 2022 Gustavo Dudamel, Venezuela

 Protégés
 1993 Benny Green
 1996 Tan Dun
 1999 Wu Man
 2002 Jean-Guihen Queyras
 2005 Roman Patkoló
 2008 Gustavo Dudamel
 2011 The Children of Sistema Toronto
 2013 L'orchestre d'hommes-orchestres
 2015 Timo Andres
 2018 Cécile McLorin Salvant
 2020 Victoria Anderson-Gardner

References

External links
 The Glenn Gould Prize
 The Glenn Gould Foundation

Glenn Gould
International music awards